The Lake Wisconsin AVA is an American Viticultural Area located in south central Wisconsin. The wine growing region borders both Lake Wisconsin and the Wisconsin River. The first grapes were planted in the area by Agoston Haraszthy in 1847, before he migrated to California. The area soils are gravel and sandy loam from glacial deposits. French hybrid grapes have had the most success in the Lake Wisconsin area, and the most important grape varietal grown in the area is Marechal Foch.

References 

American Viticultural Areas
Wisconsin wine
1994 establishments in Wisconsin